Pragyan International University is a University Grants Commission-recognised university in India established in 2016 by the Government of Jharkhand State.  The campus of the university is located in Ranchi, Jharkhand and its head office is located in Kolkata. Pragyan International University is accredited and recognised by the University Grants Commission under the section of 2(f) of UGC, Govt of India Act, 1956. The Jharkhand Gazette also approved the segment of Pragyan International University under State Government Approval Act No 11 of 2016. In 2019 the university received a AAA+ rating according to ELETS Digital Learning magazine.

External links
 Official Website

References

Universities and colleges in Ranchi
Universities in Jharkhand
Educational institutions established in 2016
2016 establishments in Jharkhand
Private universities in India